The Ministry of the Chits was the government of the Kingdom of England from November 1679 to 1688. The administration was led by three young ministers, collectively known as the chits: Laurence Hyde (Earl of Rochester, 1682), Sidney Godolphin (Lord Godolphin, 1684) and the Earl of Sunderland.

Rochester, brother-in-law of King Charles II's brother James, Duke of York, served as First Lord of the Treasury until "kicked upstairs" (term coined by Lord Halifax) as Lord President of the Council in September 1684. On the Duke of York's succession as King James II in February 1685, Rochester returned as Lord High Treasurer. He was troubled by the King's Catholicism and disputed religious matters with him. On 4 January 1687 James II dismissed Rochester and his brother the Earl of Clarendon, replacing both with Catholic appointees, Lord Belasyse (aged 72) and Lord Arundell (aged 79).

Sunderland, who served variously as Northern Secretary and Southern Secretary, and additionally as Lord President of the Council from 1685, remained in post until his dismissal by James II in October 1688, when he fled to Rotterdam.

Godolphin, First Lord of the Treasury 1684–85, was retained at the Treasury by William III, returning as First Lord in the Carmarthen Ministry of 1690.

The Chits
The moniker "the chits" stems from a satirical verse on the three ministers, attributed to John Dryden by Johnson's Dictionary:

The Ministry

November 1679 to September 1684

Lord Nottingham was Lord Chancellor until 1682, when Lord Guilford assumed the same position; however, the latter had not yet acceded to the peerage, and was therefore forced to assume the position of Lord Keeper. For all intents and purposes, these positions are identical, and have been formatted as such.
Additionally, there were two Earls of Nottingham: the elder Nottingham served as Lord Chancellor, and his successor to the earldom served as First Lord of the Admiralty.

September 1684 to February 1685

February 1685 to October 1688

References

English ministries
1679 establishments in England
1680s in England
Ministries of Charles II of England
1670s in England